Josey Montana McCoy is an American actor.

Biography
McCoy grew up in the small Appalachian town of Inez, Kentucky. His summers were spent on an outdoor stage near his home called Jenny Wiley Theatre where he fell in love with performing. He graduated from the University of Kentucky and soon thereafter moved to Los Angeles. He is heavily involved in the LA theater scene. He was voicing Kaeya in Genshin Impact and finally Kaie Ono in NEO: The World Ends with You for the video game and the TV Show who was Batwheels and he's voicing Quizz from HBO Max in Cartoonito in the Warner Bros. Discovery.

Filmography

Television
Batwheels: Quizz

Film
 Monster High: Freaky Fusion - Neighthan Rot, Victor Frankenstein
 Ever After High: Way too Wonderland - Chase Redford

Game
 Genshin Impact - Kaeya
 Lost Judgment - Additional voices
 Neo: The World Ends with You - Kaie Ono

References

External links
 Josey Montana McCoy's official website
 

Living people
American male video game actors
American male voice actors
Place of birth missing (living people)
Year of birth missing (living people)